A three-part referendum was held in Switzerland on 4 October 1896. Voters were asked whether they approved of a federal law on guarantees in the cattle trade, a federal law on the accounting system for the railways and a federal law on the disciplinary penal code for the federal army. Whilst the law on the railways was approved, the other two were rejected by voters.

Background
The referendums were optional referendums, which required only a majority of the public vote, rather than a majority of votes and cantons.

Results

Cattle trade guarantees law

Railways accounting law

Military penal code law

References

1896 referendums
1896 in Switzerland
Referendums in Switzerland